Clifford Glover was a 10-year-old African American boy who was fatally shot by Thomas Shea, an on-duty, undercover policeman, on April 28, 1973.  Glover's death, and Shea's later acquittal for a murder charge, led to riots in the South Jamaica section of Queens, New York.

Shooting
At 5 a.m. on April 28, 1973, 10-year-old Clifford Glover was shot when he decided to join his stepfather for some
work on a weekend and his stepfather was stopped by two undercover officers, Thomas Shea, and his partner Walter Scott. The two officers believed the boy and his stepfather had just committed a robbery.  Glover and his stepfather were afraid of the two officers and ran from them, believing they themselves were about to be harmed.

Shea testified that he drew fire on the boy who appeared to have a weapon.  Glover was hit by at least two bullets.  When Glover was hit, the officers claimed his father took the alleged weapon from him, which was never recovered. According to Scott the boy told him "Fuck you, you're not taking me".

Rioting
Immediately following the shooting, there were several days of riots in the South Jamaica neighborhood. At least twenty-four people, including fourteen policemen, were injured; in addition, twenty-five protesters were arrested.  There were also smaller demonstrations accusing Shea of racism outside the courthouse during the trial. The day after Shea was acquitted, hundreds of people began a riot, turning over cars, breaking windows, and stealing cash registers; one protester was arrested in the aftermath and rioters injured two police officers.

Trial
Thomas Shea was put on trial for murder. The jury of eleven white people and one black person acquitted Shea. He was the first New York City police officer ever to be tried for murder while on duty.  Shea was declared not guilty on June 12, 1974.

Cultural impact 
The killing of Clifford Glover and subsequent acquittal of Thomas Shea feature prominently in "Power", a 1975 poem by Caribbean-American poet Audre Lorde and "NYC Cops", a 2012 song by rapper Heems. The Rolling Stones reference the shooting in their 1973 song "Doo Doo Doo Doo Doo (Heartbreaker)" on the album Goat's Head Soup. Thomas Hauser writes about the shooting and the investigation in detail in The Trial of Patrolman Thomas Shea, which was published by Seven Stories Press in June, 2017.

References 

20th-century American trials
African-American riots in the United States
Criminal trials that ended in acquittal
Deaths by firearm in Queens, New York
Deaths by person in New York City
1970s in Queens
Murder trials
1973 in New York City
Riots and civil disorder in New York City
African Americans shot dead by law enforcement officers in the United States
New York City Police Department corruption and misconduct
April 1973 events in the United States
Incidents of violence against boys